North Carolina Highway 218 (NC 218) is a primary state highway in the U.S. state of North Carolina. The highway runs east–west from Mint Hill to Polkton.

Route description
NC 218 traverses ; starting in Mint Hill, it goes through northern Union County, then ends in Polkton. The entire route is a two-lane rural highway and is a significant truck route. It also has seasonal beach bound traffic. Residential communities in Union County and a few near Interstate 485 (I-485) in Mecklenburg County contribute the majority of the daily commuter traffic.

History
Established as a new primary routing in 1935, it connected the towns of Mint Hill and Polkton. In the early 1940s, it was extended in Polkton when U.S. Route 74 (US 74) was rerouted further south from town. In the 1960s, NC 218 was moved onto a new extension of Williams Street in Polkton, leaving Old US 74.

Junction list

References

External links

218
Transportation in Mecklenburg County, North Carolina
Transportation in Union County, North Carolina
Transportation in Anson County, North Carolina